THPO may refer to:

Tribal Historic Preservation Officer, and official position in the united states
Thrombopoietin, a protein
the OMIM disorder code for essential thrombocythemia, the presence of high platelet (thrombocyte) counts in the blood